Evgeny Donskoy was the defending champion but chose not to defend his title.

Gaël Monfils won the title after defeating Kwon Soon-woo 6–4, 2–6, 6–1 in the final.

Seeds

Draw

Finals

Top half

Bottom half

References
Main Draw
Qualifying Draw

OEC Kaohsiung - Singles
2018 Singles